Allah Vajeh Sar (also Romanized as Laleh Vajeh Sar and Laleh Vajh Sar; also known as Lāleh Bacheh Sar) is a village in Dehgah Rural District, Kiashahr District, Astaneh-ye Ashrafiyeh County, Gilan Province, Iran. At the 2006 census, its population was 528, in 163 families.

References 

Populated places in Astaneh-ye Ashrafiyeh County